Events during the year 1176 in Italy.

Events 
 May 29 – Battle of Legnano: Frederick I, Holy Roman Emperor, is defeated by the Lombard League, leading to the pactum Anagninum (the Agreement of Anagni).

Deaths

 Galdino della Sala (1096–1176) - Saint Galdinus

Years of the 12th century in Italy
Italy
Italy